Carrier preselect is a term relating to the telecommunications industry. It is a method of routing calls for least-cost routing (LCR) without the need for programming of PBX telephone system.

This is the process whereby a telephone subscriber whose telephone line is maintained by one company, usually a former monopoly provider (e.g. BT), can choose to have some of their calls automatically routed across a different telephone company's network (e.g. Talk Talk) without needing to enter a special code or special equipment.

See also 
 Local loop unbundling
 Wholesale line rental

External links
 Ofcom - Carrier Pre-Selection and Wholesale Line Rental
 - Outbound Carrier Pre-Selection Services from GCI
 - Outbound Carrier Pre-Selection Services from Six Degrees Group

Telephony
Local loop
Broadband
Telecommunications economics
Teletraffic
Telephone exchanges